= 4/8 =

4/8 may refer to:

- April 8 (month-day date notation)
- August 4 (day-month date notation)
